Burtenshaw is a surname. Notable people with the surname include:

Bill Burtenshaw (1925–2010), English footballer
Charlie Burtenshaw (1922–2013), English footballer
Norman Burtenshaw (born 1926), English football referee
Steve Burtenshaw (1935–2022), English footballer and manager
Van Burtenshaw, American politician